Stefano Selva (born August 24, 1969) is a Sammarinese sport shooter. He placed 32nd in the men's trap event at the 2016 Summer Olympics.

References

1969 births
Living people
Trap and double trap shooters
Sammarinese male sport shooters
Olympic shooters of San Marino
Shooters at the 2016 Summer Olympics